Adam Cianciarulo (born October 20, 1996) is an American professional motocross and supercross racer. He has competed in the AMA Motocross Championships since 2013, and currently competes on a Kawasaki KX450 for the Monster Energy-Kawasaki team. Cianciarulo is notable for winning the 2019 AMA 250cc motocross national championship.

Amateur career
Cianciarulo began riding motorcycles when he was 3 years old and was racing when he was 4 years old. In 2012, he became the highest winning mini bike rider in AMA Amateur Motocross National Championships. He won 11 amateur championships.

Professional career
In 2013, Cianciarulo began his first pro season on Monster Energy/Pro Circuit/Kawasaki, whom he signed a long-term contract with while he was an amateur. After being sick with salmonella, he missed the first four rounds of the Lucas Oil Pro Motocross series. he began his pro career by finishing inside the top 10 five times, including a podium in the first moto at Utah.

In 2014 Cianciarulo began his first 250 Monster Energy Supercross series, winning 3 out of the first 5 races including his supercross debut. Unfortunately, he received a shoulder injury in Toronto, Canada after crashing in the whoops section. He had surgery to repair the injury, causing him to miss the rest of the Monster Energy Supercross series as well as the entire Lucas Oil Pro Motocross season.

In 2015, Cianciarulo did not race any races in the Monster Energy Supercross series because of another shoulder injury that he received while racing at the Geneva Supercross in Switzerland. He raced only 6 of the 12 races in the Lucas Oil Pro Motocross series due to another shoulder injury that he received while practicing for Red Bud. Cianciarulo was having a somewhat successful year, getting on the podium once before his injury.

In 2016, it looked like it was going to be a fresh start for Cianciarulo. He parted way with his longtime trainer, Aldon Baker, and has started a new program. Early February, Monster Energy/ Pro Circuit/ Kawasaki reported that Cianciarulo had broken his wrist while practicing. This caused him to miss the entire Monster Energy Supercross series. Cianciarulo was healthy in time for the Lucas Oil Pro Motocross series, and finally finished a full season. He ended the year with 6 overall top 10’s, landing on a moto podium once.

In 2017 Cianciarulo finally had the breakout year proving he still had the speed he showed in 2014. He raced the entire Monster Energy Supercross and Lucas Oil Pro Motocross series, the first time in his career he had done so. In supercross, he earned 2 races wins; at his “Home” race at Daytona and the series finale in Las Vegas. In Pro Motocross Cianciarulo earned his first career overall at Budds Creek.

In 2018, Cianciarulo had another successful Supercross season, finishing on the podium 7 times and getting 1 win at the series finale in Las Vegas. He announced on the podium in Las Vegas that he would miss the entire Lucas Oil Pro Motocross series to have surgery on a torn ACL and MCL that he suffered in Indianapolis in 2017.

In 2019, in Glendale, Cianciarulo earned his 7th career win during his time in the series and his 1st win of the 2019 season.  He came close to winning the 250sx West championship, finishing the season with 6 podiums and 5 wins, but ultimately lost the championship to Dylan Ferrandis after a crash late in the final race.

However, Cianciarulo later won his first professional championship in the 2019 Lucas Oil Pro Motocross Series finishing with 519 total points. He is now contracted to ride for Team Monster Energy Kawasaki aboard a KX450 in the 450 class.  He also is moving on from his previous career number 92 to 9.

During the 2019 Monster Energy Cup, Cianciarulo's first professional race in the 450 class, he placed 1st overall. In the three main events, Cianciarulo placed 2nd, 2nd, and 1st to solidify his spot at the top of the podium.

Cianciarulo broke his collarbone during the first round of qualifying at the 2020 Arlington Supercross event. He underwent surgery days after the injury and will race again when healthy.

References

External links
Adam Cianciarulo Breaks Wrist, Transworld Motocross, 9 February 2016
Adam Cianciarulo and Aldon Baker Part Ways, Transworld Motocross, 6 January 2016

1996 births
Living people
People from Port Orange, Florida
Sportspeople from Florida
American motocross riders
AMA Motocross Championship National Champions